Jackel, Jäckel or Jaeckel may refer to:

 Karl Jäckel (1913–1984), German U-boat coxswain in World War II 
 Peter Jaeckel, also Peter Jäckel, mathematician, and finance academic and practitioner
 Eberhard Jäckel (born 1929), German historian, noted for his studies of Hitler's role in German history
 A German pet form for the given name Jakob, a cognate of Jacob and James in English